Gerd Vespermann (24 July 1926 – 25 November 2000) was a German stage, film and television actor. He was the son of the actors Kurt Vespermann and Lia Eibenschütz.

He was married to the actress Hannelore Elsner from 1964 to 1966.

Filmography

References

Bibliography

External links 
 

1926 births
2000 deaths
German male stage actors
German male film actors
German male television actors
Male actors from Berlin